Epictia amazonica, also known commonly as the South American blind snake, is a species of snake in the family Leptotyphlopidae. The species is native to northern South America.

Geographic range
E. amazonica is found in Colombia, French Guiana, Guyana, and southeastern Venezuela (Amazonas, Bolívar).

Reproduction
E. amazonica is oviparous.

References

Further reading
Natera-Mumaw MA, Esqueda-González LF, Castelaín-Fernández M (2015). Atlas Serpientes de Venezuela: Una Visión Actual de su Diversidad. Santiago, Chile: Dimacofi Negocios Avanzados S.A. 456 pp. . (Epictia amazonica, new combination, p. 292). (in Spanish).
Orejas-Miranda BR (1969). "Tres nuevos Leptotyphlops (Reptilia: Serpentes)". Comunicaciones Zoológicas del Museo de Historia Natural de Montevideo 10 (124): 1–11. (Leptotyphlops amazonicus, new species). (in Spanish).

Leptotyphlopidae
Snakes of South America
Reptiles described in 1969